Rendezvous Mountain State Park is a  North Carolina state park in Purlear, North Carolina.  It was originally established as North Carolina's third state park.  From 1984 to early 2022, the park was operated by the North Carolina Forest Service as Rendezvous Mountain Educational State Forest.

History 
Rendezvous Mountain is popularly rumored to have been an assembly point for the Overmountain Men during the Revolutionary War.  Colonel Benjamin Cleveland is said to have called militiamen from around Wilkes County, by blowing a large ox horn from the mountain's summit.  Cleveland was able to summon over 200 Patriots from the surrounding area to join him on a march to the Battle of Kings Mountain.  The route they took is now commemorated by the nearby Overmountain Victory National Historic Trail.

In 1926, the park's original  tract was donated to the state by Judge T. B. Finley of North Wilkesboro for inclusion in the State Park System; however, the unit was never opened to the public due to its small size, inaccessible location, and questionable historic significance.

The Civilian Conservation Corps constructed roads and trails around the mountain in the 1930s.  They also built a cabin near the mountain's summit, which still remains.

The land was transferred to the Division of Forestry in 1956. It was later opened to the public in 1984 as an educational state forest. In the early 2000s, the forest was greatly expanded when large tracts along its western boundary became available.

The Appropriations Act of 2021 instructed the NC Forest Service to transfer a mutually agreed upon portion of Rendezvous Mountain Educational State Forest to the NC Division of Parks and Recreation by February 1, 2022.  Since the forest was already split into two disconnected areas, it was agreed that the original tract and all adjoining tracts, which contained the forest's visitor facilities, would be managed as a state park.  Meanwhile, the undeveloped,  Little Fork tract would be retained by the Forest Service, and it would be leased to the North Carolina Wildlife Resources Commission as a public game land.

Nearby state parks
The following state parks and state forests are within  of Rendezvous Mountain State Park:
Elk Knob State Park
Grandfather Mountain State Park
Grayson Highlands State Park, Virginia
Mount Jefferson State Natural Area
New River State Park
Tuttle Educational State Forest
Stone Mountain State Park

References

External links 
 
 Rendezvous Mountain Educational State Forest - Former state forest website

North Carolina state forests
Protected areas of the Appalachians
Protected areas of Wilkes County, North Carolina
Education in Wilkes County, North Carolina
Open-air museums in North Carolina
Former state parks of North Carolina
1926 establishments in North Carolina
Protected areas established in 1926
State parks of North Carolina
State parks of the Appalachians